A massive blizzard and tornado outbreak that affected the Northwest, Rockies, and much of the Midwest in early-October 2013. A total of 22 tornadoes were confirmed as the system moved eastward across the eastern half of the United States, including two that were rated EF4. The storm was unofficially named Winter Storm Atlas by The Weather Channel.

Summary of events
On October 3, 2013, the National Weather Service issued a blizzard warning for Rapid City and the Black Hills in advance of the storm urging people to delay or cancel travel plans.

The snow incident trapped over six dozen people inside of their automobiles and tornadoes injured 17 people in Iowa and Nebraska. Rapid City, the second largest city in South Dakota, was engulfed in close to two feet of snow, which exceeds the amount of snow that the city has ever recorded during any whole month of October. Over 20,000 people lost electricity in Black Hills, where more than a meter of watered down, dense snow had fallen. The storm system also included thunderstorms that brought iced precipitation, significant rain and over half a dozen tornadoes to Nebraska and Iowa. Two of these tornadoes were violent enough to be rated EF4 on the Enhanced Fujita scale. Over  of Interstate 90 was shut down from South Dakota to Wyoming.

The storm affected about 5,000 ranches in western South Dakota producing snow totals as high as 5 feet and 70 mile per hour winds that scattered herds for miles and resulted in the deaths of many cattle due to exhaustion and hypothermia. In a storm South Dakotans called the Cattleman's Blizzard, at least 14,000 cattle, 1300 sheep, 300 horses, and 40 bison were killed with South Dakota ranchers reporting losses of 20 to 50 percent of their herds. Thousands of people were without power. Three people died in a motor vehicle accident on U.S. Route 20 in Nebraska.

The storm coincided with the United States federal government shutdown of 2013, which limited timely federal response to the disaster.

Confirmed tornadoes

October 3 event

October 4 event

October 5 event

October 7 event

Wayne–Wakefield, Nebraska 

A large multiple-vortex tornado, the first EF4 tornado in Nebraska since May 22, 2004, caused substantial damage along its path. Two farmsteads were struck southwest of Wayne, and many sheds and barns were either damaged or destroyed. Two homes in this area sustained EF3-strength damage as well. The tornado moved into the east side of Wayne, causing severe damage to a softball complex, damaging farm equipment at a dealership, and either damaging or completely destroying many large industrial metal buildings at an industrial park, some of which were either badly mangled or completely reduced to rubble. At this point, the tornado had reached its peak intensity, with widespread EF3 damage, and a few pockets of EF4-strength damage were noted. It then directly hit the Wayne Municipal Airport, where two hangars were flattened, leading to the destruction of 15 planes, and the AWOS was shredded and scattered over unknown distances. The tornado then caused EF2-type damage to another farmstead before crossing into Dixon County, where it narrowed, weakened, and eventually dissipated after causing roof, window, and siding damage to a few more houses, overturning a camper, and either heavily damaging or destroying a grain bin and numerous farm buildings, as well as farm equipment. Many trees were downed and crops were flattened along the path. Fifteen people were injured by the tornado. John Dunning, Chief Information Officer of Wayne State College, was critically injured, but has since recovered. He would have likely died had he stayed in his truck. This tornado caused $50.5 million, mainly in Wayne. This became the first F4/EF4 tornado in October in the US since the Windsor Locks, Connecticut tornado of 1979, and the first tornado in Nebraska in October since 2001.

See also
 List of North American tornadoes and tornado outbreaks
 Weather of 2013

Notes

References

2013–14 North American winter
2013 disasters in Canada
2013 meteorology
2013 natural disasters
2013 natural disasters in the United States
F4 tornadoes by date
 ,2013-10-03
Natural disasters in South Dakota
2013 10
Weather events in the United States
October 2013 events in North America
Natural disasters in Nebraska
Tornadoes in Nebraska
Tornadoes in Iowa
Tornadoes in Wisconsin
Tornadoes in New Jersey
Tornadoes of 2013